The Sabasa (also: Sabașa) is a left tributary of the river Bistrița in Romania. It flows into the Bistrița in Borca.

References

Rivers of Romania
Rivers of Neamț County